|}

The Glasgow Stakes is a Listed flat horse race in Great Britain open to three-year-old horses. It is run at Hamilton Park over a distance of 1 mile, 3 furlongs and 15 yards (2,227 metres), and it is scheduled to take place each year in July.

History
The event was formerly contested at York over 1 mile, 2 furlongs and 88 yards. It used to be held in May, and it sometimes served as a trial for the Epsom Derby. Both races were won by Commander in Chief in 1993.

The Glasgow Stakes was given Listed status in 1999. For a period it was restricted to colts and geldings. It was last run at York in 2004.

The race was transferred to Hamilton Park, several miles to the south-east of Glasgow, in 2006. It was reopened to fillies and switched to mid-July in 2011.

Records
Leading jockey since 1976 (5 wins):
 Pat Eddery – Illustrious Prince (1976), New Berry (1979), Pelerin (1980), Polish Blue (1992), Commander in Chief (1993)

Leading trainer since 1976 (7 wins):
 Sir Michael Stoute – Hill's Yankee (1978), Sasaki (1990), Polish Blue (1992), Foyer (1994), Dr Massini (1996), Greek Dance (1998), Tam Lin (2006)

Winners since 1976

See also
 Horse racing in Great Britain
 List of British flat horse races

References
 Paris-Turf:
 Racing Post:

 pedigreequery.com – Glasgow Stakes – Hamilton.

Flat races in Great Britain
Hamilton Park Racecourse
Flat horse races for three-year-olds
Sport in South Lanarkshire